{{Infobox rail service
| box_width       = 
| name            = Cape Codder
| logo            = 
| logo_width      = 
| image           = 
| image_width     =  
| caption         =  
| type            = Inter-city rail
| status          = Discontinued
| locale          = Northeastern United States
| predecessor     = 
| first           = 1927, 1937
| last            = 1958, 1964
| successor       = Cape Codder (train) (Amtrak)
| operator        = 
| formeroperator  = New York, New Haven and Hartford Railroad
| ridership       = 
| ridership2      = 
| website         = 
| start           = New York, New York
| stops           = 
| end             = Hyannis, Massachusetts, Woods Hole, Massachusetts
| distance        =  (New York - Hyannis) 
| journeytime     = 
| frequency       = 
| trainnumber     = 
| line_used       = 
| class           = 
| access          = 
| seating         = Coaches (Day Cape Codder, Night Cape Codder)
| sleeping        = Roomettes, open sections, double bedrooms, drawing rooms and compartments (Night Cape Codder)
| autorack        = 
| catering        = Dining car (Day Cape Codder)
| observation     = Parlor car (Day Cape Codder) (1955)
| entertainment   = 
| baggage         = 
| otherfacilities = 
| stock           = 
| gauge           = 
| el              = 
| speed           = 
| owners          = 
| routenumber     = 
| map             = 
| map_state       = 
}}
The Cape Codder was a pair of day and night passenger trains run by the New York, New Haven and Hartford Railroad (NH) from the latter 1920s to the mid 1960s, with some brief interruptions. Its distinction was the longest tenure of direct summertime New York City to Cape Cod trains. With the improvement of highways in southeastern Massachusetts, passenger rail traffic diminished, and the Cape Codder service ended with the New Haven Railroad's discontinuing of passenger rail service to Cape Cod.

History

The earliest iteration of the train was as a named night train, the Cape Codder beginning in 1927, running as a weekend train. It was all-Pullman, meaning that it carried only sleeping cars, no coaches. It ran from New York City's Grand Central Terminal, to Provincetown, the furthest extent of Cape Cod. Additional branches departed from the train, going to Woods Hole and Hyannis. Sleeping car equipment originating in Washington, D.C. would connect at New Haven, Connecticut. At Woods Hole ferries were available for transport to Nantucket Island and Martha's Vineyard.

In 1937 the NH inaugurated the Day Cape Codder which would travel daily from New York City to the Woods Hole and the Hyannis branches. The New Haven's Night Cape Codder provided the night train service to the same branches on Cape Cod (daily except Sunday eastbound, and daily except Friday and Saturday westbound). Similar to the earlier incarnation, the Night Cape Codder also ran in an express fashion, bypassing Stamford and only stopping at New Haven before stopping again in Wareham. The NH at this time ran additional daytime trains operating only on Fridays, Cape Cod bound, and Sundays, westbound, the Islander and Neptune. The Islander only served the Woods Hole branch. All of the daytime trains offered dining car and grill car service.'The Enterprise,' "New York Trains To Stop" February 2, 1965 https://www.capenews.net/the_enterprise_archives/railroad/new-york-trains-to-stop/article_eb6cea62-0da0-11e7-9f0b-eba88dc8db11.html By 1938, the NH terminated its passenger service to Provincetown.

During World War II the New Haven suspended the Night Cape Codder, and from 1943 to 1945 it also suspended the Islander and Neptune trains. The Day Cape Codder was suspended during 1945 when railroad equipment was needed for transporting returning soldiers. The Day Cape Codder and Neptune returned in 1946 and the nighttime train returned for the summer 1948 season. The Neptune and the Night Cape Codder only operated on Fridays eastbound and Sundays westbound.New Haven Railroad timetable, June 2, 1946, Tables 29, 30 The Night Cape Codder for most of its years had the open sections and private bedrooms. By summer, 1955 the train included modern roomettes as well.

In 1958 the New Haven Railroad drew down its southeastern Massachusetts operations. This would include its Cape Cod operations too. However, for the 1960 to 1964 summer seasons, the Day Cape Codder and the Neptune'' would return.

New York - Cape Cod service, provided by Amtrak would return briefly in the 1980s and 1990s as the namesake train.

References

External links
 New Haven RR Timetable, 1955, Cape Codder service: Tables 29, 30

Named passenger trains of the United States
Passenger trains of the New York, New Haven and Hartford Railroad
Passenger rail transportation in Rhode Island
Passenger rail transportation in Massachusetts
Passenger rail transportation in Connecticut
Passenger rail transportation in New York (state)
Railway services introduced in 1927
Railway services discontinued in 1964